Shalimar Express is a daily train between Delhi and Jammu Tawi. It is operated by the Northern Railways. Its number is 14645/14646. It comes in the Non Superfast (Mail/Express) trains category of the Indian Railways.

History and etymology
The Shalimar Express is one of the oldest trains to Jammu Tawi. It has been given the name 'Shalimar' with reference to the Shalimar Gardens of Srinagar, as Jammu Tawi was the nearest railway station to Srinagar at that time.

Arrival and departure

The train leaves at 15:50 every day from Delhi to Jammu Tawi. It reaches Jammu Tawi the next morning, early, at around 05:20. While heading towards the Capital, it leaves Jammu Tawi at 20:45 from #platform 3 and arrives at Delhi at about 10:50 at platform 1 at the next morning.

Route and halts
Shalimar
Vishakanapatnam
Secandrabad JUnction
Khammam
Vijaywada Junction
Tenali Junction
Nellore
Gudur Junction
Naidupeta
Chennai Central

See also

 Jhelum Express
 Vivek Express
 Jammu–Baramulla line

References

Transport in Jammu
Transport in Delhi
Named passenger trains of India
Rail transport in Jammu and Kashmir
Rail transport in Uttar Pradesh
Rail transport in Haryana
Rail transport in Delhi
Rail transport in Punjab, India
Express trains in India